Gennadij Cudinovic (born 21 February 1994) is a German freestyle wrestler.

He won one of the bronze medals in the men's 97 kg event at the 2017 European U23 Wrestling Championship held in Szombathely, Hungary. He competed in the men's 97 kg event at the European Wrestling Championships in 2018, 2019 and 2020.

In 2019, he represented Germany in the men's 97 kg event at the European Games held in Minsk, Belarus. He was eliminated in his first match by Aliaksandr Hushtyn of Belarus.

In March 2021, he qualified at the European Qualification Tournament to compete at the 2020 Summer Olympics in Tokyo, Japan. He competed in the men's 125 kg event where he was eliminated in his second match by Mönkhtöriin Lkhagvagerel of Mongolia.

In 2022, he competed at the Yasar Dogu Tournament held in Istanbul, Turkey. He also competed in the 125 kg event at the 2022 European Wrestling Championships held in Budapest, Hungary. He competed in the 125kg event at the 2022 World Wrestling Championships held in Belgrade, Serbia.

References

External links 
 
 
 

1994 births
Living people
Place of birth missing (living people)
German male sport wrestlers
German people of Ukrainian descent
Wrestlers at the 2019 European Games
European Games competitors for Germany
Wrestlers at the 2020 Summer Olympics
Olympic wrestlers of Germany
21st-century German people